Ma Fung-kwok is a member of the Provisional Legislative Council and Legislative Council of Hong Kong from for Election Committee constituency and Sports, Performing Arts, Culture and Publication from 1997 to 2000 and 2012 to present. He has also been the leader of New Century Forum. He supported Leung Chun-ying in the 2012 Chief Executive race and is seen as an ally of CY Leung in the Legislative Council.

Bypassing airport security

On 21 May 2018, Ma Fun-kwok allegedly used his status as a legislator to bypass airport security rules to bring a 200g bottle of hair gel into the restricted area.

Legislative Council 
In December 2021, it was reported that Ma had a "privileged" vote in the 2021 Hong Kong legislative election, where the vote would count approximately 7,215 times more than an ordinary citizen.

In January 2022, the mainland Chinese national emblem was permanently added to the Legislative Council chamber, after Andrew Leung, Starry Lee Wai-king and Ma Fung-kwok decided that it should be made permanent. Andrew Leung had earlier said it would be only temporary for the swearing in of lawmakers.

In July 2022, Ma said that many teenagers in Hong Kong would like to serve in the mainland Chinese military.

References

 Member of the Legislative Council – Hon MA Fung-kwok

Living people
1955 births
Delegates to the 10th National People's Congress from Hong Kong
Delegates to the 11th National People's Congress from Hong Kong
Delegates to the 12th National People's Congress from Hong Kong
Delegates to the 13th National People's Congress from Hong Kong
Delegates to the 14th National People's Congress from Hong Kong
HK LegCo Members 1998–2000
HK LegCo Members 2000–2004
HK LegCo Members 2012–2016
HK LegCo Members 2016–2021
HKFS people
Members of the Provisional Legislative Council
Members of the Selection Committee of Hong Kong
New Century Forum politicians
Recipients of the Silver Bauhinia Star